The Mac Intox is a Czech single-place paraglider that was designed by Peter Recek and produced by Mac Para Technology of Rožnov pod Radhoštěm, starting in 2003. It is now out of production.

Design and development
The aircraft was designed as an intermediate glider. The models are each named for their approximate wing area in square metres.

Variants
Intox 22
Small-sized model for lighter pilots.
Intox 25
Mid-sized model for medium-weight pilots. The glider model is DHV 2 certified.
Intox 28
Large-sized model for heavier pilots. The glider model is DHV 2 certified.
Intox 30
Extra large-sized model for even heavier pilots. The glider model is DHV 2 certified.

Specifications (Intox 28)

References

External links

Intox
Paragliders